Sang Ruj (also Romanized as Sang Rūj; also known as Sang Karūch, Sang Rūch, and Sankarūch) is a village in Shohada Rural District, Yaneh Sar District, Behshahr County, Mazandaran Province, Iran. At the 2006 census, its population was 184, in 35 families.

References 

Populated places in Behshahr County